Aleksandar Ugrinoski (born May 7, 1988) is a Macedonian-Croatian former professional basketball player.

Professional career
Ugrinoski started out his career by coming off the bench for the Cibona VIP at age 14, later becoming the youngest player to start in Euroleague history, starting at the age of 15 years, 266 days old. Only two other players in Can Maxim Mutaf and Manuchar Markoishvili would start in the Euroleague at the age of 15. However, he finished his career playing with Karpoš Sokoli of the Macedonian First League at the young age of 25.

Croatian national team
Ugrinoski was also member of U-18 Croatian national basketball team.

See also 
 List of youngest EuroLeague players

References

External links
 Aleksandar Ugrinoski at aba-liga.com
 Aleksandar Ugrinoski at basketball-reference.com
 Aleksandar Ugrinoski at eurobasket.com

1988 births
Living people
Sportspeople from Skopje
Croatian people of Macedonian descent
ABA League players
BC Rilski Sportist players
Croatian men's basketball players
KK Cibona players
KK Rabotnički players
Macedonian men's basketball players
Utah Flash players
Point guards
KK Dubrava players
KK Vardar players
Basket Rimini Crabs players
Traiskirchen Lions players